Bidhannagar Assembly constituency is an assembly constituency in North 24 Parganas district in the Indian state of West Bengal.

Overview
As per orders of the Delimitation Commission, No. 116 Bidhannagar Assembly constituency is composed of the following: Wards 28-41 of Bidhannagar Municipal Corporation (Before 2015 Bidhannagar Municipality) and Ward Nos. 19, 20 and 28 to 35 of South Dum Dum municipality.

Bidhannagar Assembly constituency is part of No. 17 Barasat (Lok Sabha constituency).

Members of Legislative Assembly

Election results

2021

2016

2011
In the 2011 election, Sujit Bose of Trinamool Congress defeated his nearest rival Palash Das of CPI(M).

References

Assembly constituencies of West Bengal
Politics of North 24 Parganas district